The Sikorsky R-6 is an American light two-seat helicopter of the 1940s. In Royal Air Force and Royal Navy service, it was named the Hoverfly II.

Development

The R-6/Hoverfly II was developed to improve on the successful Sikorsky R-4. In order to enhance performance, a completely new streamlined fuselage was designed and the boom carrying the tail rotor was lengthened and straightened. The main rotor and transmission system of the R-4 were retained. Sikorsky allotted their Model 49 designation to the new design.

Initial production was by Sikorsky, but most examples were built by Nash-Kelvinator. Some of the later aircraft were fitted with more powerful engines.

Operational history

The first R-6s were delivered to the United States Army Air Forces (USAAF) in late 1944 and some were transferred to the United States Navy (USN). It was initially intended to pass 150 R-6s to the Royal Air Force (RAF), but delays caused by the switch of production from Sikorsky's factory at Stratford, Connecticut, to Nash-Kelvinator at Detroit, Michigan, meant that only 27 R-6As were actually delivered to the RAF as the Hoverfly II. Fifteen of these were passed on to the Royal Navy's Fleet Air Arm (FAA).

Some of the RAF examples were allotted to 657 Squadron RAF for proving the use of helicopters in the Army Co-operation role, and two external stretchers could be fitted to the fuselage.  657 Squadron operated their Hoverfly IIs as Air Observation Posts, spotting for Army artillery units. The Hoverfly IIs remained in operation until April 1951, and one squadron example was displayed at the September 1950 Farnborough Air Show.

The FAA used their Hoverfly IIs in the training and liaison roles. Naval units to use the type included 771 Squadron from December 1945, followed by 705 Squadron.

The USAAF operated their R-6s in secondary roles and the survivors were redesignated H-6A in 1948. The USN examples were designated the HOS-1 and a further 64 were intended to be transferred from the USAAF, but this did not take place.

Disposals of surplus military S-49s were made in the civil market in the late 1940s but none now remain in operation. Four are currently displayed in US museums.

Variants

XR-6  prototype powered by a  Lycoming O-435-7 (one)
XR-6A  as XR-6 but powered by the  Franklin O-405-9 (five) of which three to the US Navy as XHOS-1
YR-6A  as XR-6A with small changes (26) built by Nash-Kelvinator
R-6A  production model (193) built by Nash-Kelvinator of which 36 to US Navy as HOS-1 and 27 to the RAF as Hoverfly II
R-6B  projected variant with  Lycoming O-435-7, but not proceeded with 
XR-7  projected development of the XR-6 with a  Franklin O-405-9 engine, not built.
Doman LZ-1
One R-6A modified as a testbed
Doman LZ-1A
One R-6A modified as a testbed with a Doman-designed hingeless rotor blades and self-lubricating rotor hub.

Operators

 Royal Air Force

 United States Army Air Forces 
162nd Liaison Squadron
 United States Air Force
 72d Liaison Squadron
 United States Coast Guard 
 United States Navy
The mexican air force opered one ejemplar 1952 - 1970

Aircraft on display
 43-45462 – R-6A on static display at the Museo Militar de Aviacion in Santa Lucía Air Force Base Num 1.
 43-45473 – R-6A on static display at the United States Army Aviation Museum at Fort Rucker near Ozark, Alabama.
 43-45379 – R-6A on static display at the National Museum of the United States Air Force in Dayton, Ohio.
 43-45480 – LZ-1A on static display at the New England Air Museum in Windsor Locks, Connecticut. It was converted by Doman from the R-6.
 43-45531 – R-6 under restoration at the American Helicopter Museum and Education Center in West Chester, Pennsylvania.

Specifications (R-6A)

See also

References

Notes

Bibliography

External links

 Sikorsky S-49/R-6A/HOS-1/Hoverfly Mk II page at the Sikorsky Archives
 Sikorsky R-6A page at the National Museum of the United States Air Force
  Data and image of R-6

1940s United States military utility aircraft
United States military helicopters
1940s United States helicopters
R-006
Single-engined piston helicopters
Aircraft first flown in 1943